Colpa Del Sole is a 1951 Italian film.

Cast
Strelsa Brown, Giancarlo Sbragia, Clotilde Scarpitta

External links
 

Alberto Moravia
1951 films
Italian short films
1950s Italian-language films
Italian drama films
1950s Italian films